Aliens is a novel by Mary Tappan Wright. It was first published in hardcover by Charles Scribner's Sons in March, 1902. It was Wright's first published novel and second published book. It was reprinted by Kessinger Publishing, LLC, in June, 2007.

Reception
According to its review in The New York Times, the novel presents "a wonderfully graphic picture of the South as it is to-day. A picture vivid with the descriptions of the violent antagonisms which still sway that unhappy region, pathetic in the portrayal of the misery of the negroes, and full of charm in the lovely pictures of the soft beauty of the Southern savannahs. ... No one can read the book without learning much of the beautiful and unhappy South land, of which most Northerners are ignorant ..."

External links
 Google e-text of the novel
 "Mary Tappan Wright's 'Aliens.' - a review in The New York Times, May 17, 1902.

1902 American novels
Novels by Mary Tappan Wright
1902 debut novels